Nizhny Sayantuy (Doodo Saianta) is a rural locality (a selo) in Tarbagataysky District, Republic of Buryatia, Russia. The population was 2,829 as of 2010. There are 97 streets.

Geography 
Nizhny Sayantuy is located 36 km north of Tarbagatay (the district's administrative centre) by road. Voznesenovka is the nearest rural locality.

References 

Rural localities in Tarbagataysky District